Aloud is an American indie rock band. The band was formed in Boston, Massachusetts in 2002 by principal vocalists and songwriters Jen de la Osa and Henry Beguiristain, accompanied by bassist Charles Murphy, drummer Chris Jago. Primarily a quartet for the majority of its existence, Aloud expanded their permanent lineup in 2017 to include saxophonist Alanah Ntzouras and trumpeter Vanessa Acosta. The band's songwriting and vocal abilities are often highlighted by critics. While generally known for a more energetic sound, Aloud changed tack and pared down their sound on their third studio album, Exile. Their fifth studio album, Sprezzatura, was released on May 8, 2020.

Studio albums

EPs

Singles

Videos

Music videos

Soundtracks

Compilations

Other releases

References

Discographies of American artists